Caverion is a Finnish listed company that designs, implements, and maintains building technology and industrial services. Its offering covers the entire life cycle of buildings, infrastructure, or industrial sites and processes: from design and build to projects, technical and industrial maintenance, facility management, and advisory services. The company has two business units: Services and Projects and has about 14,500 employees in 10 countries. Its shares are listed on the Nasdaq Helsinki.

History 

Caverion was established in June 2013 through the demerger of the Building Services and Industrial Services businesses from YIT Group. The company has a long heritage, with roots in many different countries. As part of YIT, the company's roots go back to 1912 in Finland. In some divisions, the roots of later-integrated companies go back even to the 19th century.

Key mergers and acquisitions

2013 
Caverion Corporation was established on June 30, 2013, through the partial demerger of YIT Corporation, when YIT's Building Services and Industrial Services operations were transferred to an independent company. Trading in Caverion Corporation's shares on the Helsinki Stock Exchange (NASDAQ OMX Helsinki Ltd) began on July 1, 2013

2015 

 Acquisition of Esco Norway, Norway

2016 

 Acquisition of Arneg Kühlmöbel. Austria
 Acquisition of Sähkötaso Esitystekniikka Oy, Finland

2017 

 Asset deal with Enegia covering remote property management in Finland
 Divestment of product business under the Krantz brand, Germany

2018 

 Acquisition of Jetitek Oy, Finland
 Divestment of piping and tank business and the related Ylivieska workshop, Finland
 Divestment of Czech subsidiary, Caverion Česká republika s.r.o.

2019 

 Acquisition of Maintpartner's operations in Finland, Estonia and Poland
 Acquisition of Refrigeration Solutions business of Huurre Group Oy in Finland and Sweden
 Acquisition of Pelsu Pelastussuunnitelma Oy, Finland
 Divestment of Polish subsidiary, Caverion Polska Sp. Z o.o.

2020 

 Divestment of the parts of Industry operations to Elcoline Oy

2021 

 Acquisition of GTS Immobilien GmbH in Austria
 Acquisition of Felcon GmBH in Austria
 Acquisition of RPH Linc AB in Sweden
 Acquisition of Merius Oy in Finland
 Acquisition of Bott Kälte- und Klimatechnik in Germany
 Divestment of the subsidiary in Russia

2022 

 Divestment of ALEA GmbH in Austria
 Acquisition of Carrier's food retail refrigeration business in Finland
 Acquisition of LukkoPro in Finland
 Acquisition of Simex Klima & Kulde AS in Norway
 Acquisition of CS electric A/S in Denmark
 Acquisition of Visi Oy in Finland
 Acquisition of PORREAL Group in Austria
 Division of the business of Botnia Mill Service between Caverion and Metsä Fibre 
 Acquisition of WT-Service Oy in Finland
 Acquisition of Wind Controller in Finland
 Acquisition of the business of Kaldt og Varmt AS in Norway
 Acquisition of DI-Teknik A/S in Denmark
 Acquisition of the business of Frödéns Ventilation AB in Sweden

Corporate governance 

Caverion announced on May 19, 2021 that the Board of Directors had appointed Jacob Götzsche as the President and CEO of Caverion Corporation. He started in this position on August 9, 2021

Ownership 

Biggest shareholders at the end of May 2022:

 Herlin Antti
 Fennogens Investments
 Varma Mutual Pension Insurance Company
 Mandatum Companies
 Säästöpankki Funds
 Ilmarinen Mutual Pension Insurance Company
 Elo Mutual Pension Insurance Company
 Caverion Oyj
 The State Pension Fund
 Brotherus Ilkka

Sustainability 

Caverion's sustainability target by 2030 is to create sustainable impact through our solutions, with a positive carbon handprint 10 times greater than the company's own carbon footprint. The company has three focus areas in sustainability:

 Decreasing our footprint
 Increasing our handprint
 Caring for our people
 Ensuring sustainable value chain

Controversies 
According to KPMG in November 2019 Norwegian Caverion and Lithuania Caverion paid employees in Norway 99 krones an hour while minimum wage was 184,36 Norwegian krones an hour.

The incident was investigated by Statsbygg in Norway and though several regulatory violations were found, among them violating subcontractors pay and working conditions, the violations were not of the nature that Caverion was considered to have engaged in social dumping.

References

External links 
 

Construction and civil engineering companies of Finland
1912 establishments in Finland
Construction and civil engineering companies established in 1912
Companies listed on Nasdaq Helsinki